Arslanovo (Arıślan) is a rural locality (a selo) in Staromusinsky Selsoviet, Karmaskalinsky District, Bashkortostan, Russia. The population was 209 as of 2010. There are 2 streets.

Geography 
Arslanovo is located 22 km west of Karmaskaly (the district's administrative centre) by road. Akkul and Shaymuratovo are the nearest rural localities.

References 

Rural localities in Karmaskalinsky District